Luzzana is a comune (municipality) in the Province of Bergamo in the Italian region of Lombardy, located about  northeast of Milan and about  east of Bergamo.

Luzzana borders the following municipalities: Albino, Borgo di Terzo, Entratico, Trescore Balneario.

Demographic evolution

References